A plea is an answer to a claim in a criminal court case.

Plea may also refer to:
 Plea (insect), a genus of bugs
 The Plea (film), a Soviet film
 The Plea (band), an Irish music band
 Alassane Pléa, French footballer

See also 
 Plead
 Plee